László Deutsch (born 9 March 1999) is a Hungarian football defender who plays for OTP Bank Liga club Vasas.

Club career
On 29 June 2022, Deutsch moved to Vasas.

Career statistics
.

References

External links
 
 

1999 births
Footballers from Budapest
Living people
Hungarian footballers
Hungary youth international footballers
Hungary under-21 international footballers
Association football defenders
Puskás Akadémia FC II players
Puskás Akadémia FC players
Csákvári TK players
Vasas SC players
Nemzeti Bajnokság I players
Nemzeti Bajnokság II players
Nemzeti Bajnokság III players